VVC  may refer to:
 Variable Valve Control , an automobile variable valve timing technology
 Versatile Video Coding, a video compression standard developed by ISO/IEC MPEG and ITU-T VCEG 
 Victor Valley College, of Victorville, California
 Virtual value chain, a business model
 All-Russia Exhibition Centre, abbreviated as GAO "VVC" (Gosudarstvennoye Aktsionernoye Obshchestvo "Vserossiyskiy Vystavochny Centr")
 La Vanguardia Airport (IATA code VVC)
 Vulvovaginal candidiasis, more commonly known as vaginal yeast infection